Cicerone Manolache (born 16 May 1936) is a Romanian former footballer and manager who played as a forward and made four appearances for the Romania national team.

International career
Manolache made his debut for Romania's Olympic team on 25 November 1962 in a 1964 European Nations' Cup qualifying match against Spain, in which he scored Romania's second goal in a 3–1 win. Including Olympics matches, he went on to make seven appearances, scoring three goals, before making his last appearance on 3 November 1963 in a 1964 Summer Olympics football qualification match against Denmark, which finished as a 2–3 loss.

Career statistics

International

International goals

Honours

Managerial honours
CARA Brazzaville
Congo Premier League: 1973
African Cup of Champions Clubs: 1974

Notes

References

External links
 
 Cicerone Manolache at RomanianSoccer.ro
 
 

1936 births
Living people
People from Vrancea County
Romanian footballers
Olympic footballers of Romania
Romania international footballers
Association football forwards
CSM Reșița players
FC Politehnica Timișoara players
FCV Farul Constanța players
FC CFR Timișoara players
Liga I players
Liga II players
Romanian football managers
Romanian expatriate football managers
Expatriate football managers in the Republic of the Congo
Expatriate football managers in Libya
Romanian expatriates in Libya
Congo national football team managers
FC UTA Arad managers
CSM Reșița managers
FC Politehnica Timișoara managers
Libya national football team managers